was a Japanese nurse.

Career
Hospital director Ōmori Harutoyo, gave her a chance to oversee education inland, after her graduation in 1903.  was established, she was appointed chief clinical nurse and after it was commissioned she became general head nurse She worked to develop a nursing school. With construction of diagnosis and treatment departments, she became the chief nurse of the department of ophthalmology, dermatology and otorhinolaryngology.

In 1908, she held  retreats for young nurses, naming the retreat Wakaba-kai (若葉会). These retreats came to symbolize the nurse. She published a collection of haiku.

In 1933, she retired from nursing and spent the rest of her life doing reading or making haiku in Fukuoka City Hirao lodge. After retiring, she published Wakaba (若葉) magazine, and worked to develop the study of nursing ethics for Kyushu University.

Death and legacy
In 1963, she died at the age of 92. In the same year Kyushu University made a bust of her, to honor her achievements in celebration of the University's 60th anniversary.

See also
 List of nurses

References

External links
 九州大学病院-キャンパス情報「吉田とめ女史之像」Kyushu University Medical school (in Japanese).

1876 births
1963 deaths
Japanese nurses
Kyushu University
Japanese women poets
Writers from Fukuoka Prefecture
20th-century Japanese poets
20th-century Japanese women writers